Jatt Te Dogar is a 1983 Pakistan Punjabi language film, directed by Imtiaz Qureshi and produced by Agha Imtiaz Ali Khan. The film stars are actors Sultan Rahi, Mumtaz, Mustafa Qureshi and Adeeb.

Cast
 Sultan Rahi - Achhu
 Mustafa Qureshi - Khanu
 Mumtaz - (love interest of Achhu)
 Durrdana Rehman - (sister of achhu)
 Adeeb - (Jageerdar) 
 Agha Sikandar - (Bau Sikandar)
 Changezi
 Rangeela - (Jeera)
 Altaf Khan
 Bahar Begum
 Khawar Abbas
 Sawan - (badro)
 Jaggi Malik
 Nasrullah Butt
 Zahir Shah 
 Achi Khan 
 Maqbool Anwar
 Raj Multani
 Booliay
 Musarrat Iman
 Sabahna
 Shaheen
 Jabroo
 Fida Malik 
 Ali Nasir
 Insaf Waris - (child actor)
 Parvez Rahi - (child actor)
 Adeeb

Track list
The music of the film is by famous musician Wajahat Attre. The lyrics are penned by Khawaja Pervez and the singers are Noor Jehan, Naheed Akhtar, Masood Rana.

References

External links
 

Pakistani action films
1983 films
Punjabi-language Pakistani films
1980s Punjabi-language films
Pakistani biographical films